Pilson is a surname. Notable people with the surname include:

Jeff Pilson (born 1959), American musician
Neal Pilson (born 1940), American television executive

See also
Hilson